Halali Airport  is an airport serving the resort of Halali, in the Oshikoto Region of Namibia. The resort is near some of the waterholes of the Etosha National Park, and has elevated viewing platforms for observing native wildlife like elephants, rhinoceros, and leopards.

See also

List of airports in Namibia
Transport in Namibia

References

External links
OurAirports - Halali
OpenStreetMap - Halali

Airports in Namibia